Lubunca, Labunca or Lubunyaca is a secret Turkish cant and slang used by sex workers and LGBT community in Turkey. The term originated from the root lubni, which is the Romani word for "prostitute".

Background 
Lubunca is derived from slang used by Romani people. It contains terms from other languages, including Greek, Arabic, Armenian and French.

Lubunca is an argot of approximately four hundred words and was spoken by the köçeks and tellaks between the 17th and 18th centuries. It was later adopted and developed by transvestites. It is believed that it was developed to avoid persecution while secretly communicating in public areas. It has been in use since the late Ottoman era .

Examples 
In Lubunca, manti means 'pleasant' or 'beautiful'. Balamoz describes old males. Madilik means 'evil' and gullüm means 'fun'.

See also 

 LGBT slang
 Polari
 Gayle
 Swardspeak
 IsiNgqumo
 Hijra Farsi
 Kaliarda
 Pajubá
 Bahasa Binan

References

External links 

 "Lubunca sözlük" at TimeOut İstanbul

LGBT linguistics
LGBT culture in Turkey
LGBT slang
Cant languages